Xysmalobium samoritourei is a newly discovered species of plant native to the highlands of Guinea. It is an erect perennial herb with annual stems. It is delimited as a member of the Apocynaceae family and classified as an endangered species.

Description 
An erect herb that grows up to 35 cm high, tuberous stem; napiform and arising from underground.

Distribution 
Species is largely found in the countries of Guinea and Sierra Leone.

References

Flora of Sierra Leone
Apocynaceae